Hubbell is an unincorporated community and census-designated place (CDP) in Houghton County in the U.S. state of Michigan. As of the 2010 census, the CDP population was 946, down from 1,105 at the 2000 census. The community is partially within Torch Lake Township and partially within Osceola Township.

The ZIP code is 49934 and the FIPS place code is 39680. It is named after Jay Abel Hubbell, a U.S. Representative (1873–1882) from the area.

Geography

Demographics

As of the census of 2000, there were 1,105 people, 411 households, and 286 families residing in the CDP. The racial makeup of the CDP was 98.64% White, 0.09% Black or African American, 0.18% Native American, 0.09% Asian, 0.09% from other races, and 0.90% from two or more races. Hispanic or Latino of any race were 1.00% of the population. 23.7% were of Finnish, 18.4% French, 11.9% German, 10.9% French Canadian, 8.9% English and 6.9% Italian ancestry according to Census 2000.

There were 411 households, out of which 31.4% had children under the age of 18 living with them, 53.3% were married couples living together, 9.5% had a female householder with no husband present, and 30.4% were non-families. 25.5% of all households were made up of individuals, and 14.1% had someone living alone who was 65 years of age or older.  The average household size was 2.48 and the average family size was 2.95.

In the CDP, the population was spread out, with 23.5% under the age of 18, 6.2% from 18 to 24, 27.5% from 25 to 44, 21.4% from 45 to 64, and 21.3% who were 65 years of age or older.  The median age was 41 years. For every 100 females, there were 87.3 males.  For every 100 females age 18 and over, there were 84.9 males.

The median income for a household in the CDP was $29,612, and the median income for a family was $35,481. Males had a median income of $28,750 versus $25,781 for females. The per capita income for the CDP was $19,260.  About 10.5% of families and 13.1% of the population were below the poverty line, including 21.1% of those under age 18 and 12.2% of those age 65 or over.

Climate
This climatic region is typified by wide seasonal temperature variance, with warm to hot (and often humid) summers and cold (sometimes severely cold) winters with large amounts of snowfall. According to the Köppen Climate Classification system, Hubbell has a humid continental climate, abbreviated "Dfb" on climate maps.

References

Unincorporated communities in Houghton County, Michigan
Census-designated places in Michigan
Houghton micropolitan area, Michigan
Unincorporated communities in Michigan
Census-designated places in Houghton County, Michigan